Associação Cultural Videobrasil (or simply Videobrasil) is an organization that hosts the International Electronic Art Festival in Brazil. The festival is hosted in São Paulo. The program has included installations, performances, VJs, CD-ROM art, and Internet art.

The Festival includes a competitive exhibition of southern circuit artwork. Art shows, debates, and meetings also take place.

Associação Cultural Videobrasil, established in 1991, is a reference center for electronic art in Brazil, as well as a center for international interchange among artists, curators, and theoreticians. The Videobrasil collection features nearly 4-thousand pieces of electronic art.

References

External links
 Official website: http://www.videobrasil.org.br

Culture in São Paulo
Arts festivals in Brazil
New media art festivals
Film festivals in Brazil
Festivals in São Paulo